Amibegron (SR-58,611A) was a drug developed by Sanofi-Aventis (now Sanofi) which acts as a selective agonist for the β3 adrenergic receptor. It is the first orally active β3 agonist developed that is capable of entering the central nervous system, and has antidepressant and anxiolytic effects.

On July 31, 2008, Sanofi-Aventis announced that it has decided to discontinue development of amibegron.

References 

Abandoned drugs
Phenylethanolamines
Beta3-adrenergic agonists
Chloroarenes
Phenoxyacetic acids
Aminotetralins